Marco Nicolini (born 15 September 1970) is a Sammarinese writer and politician and one of the Captains Regent with Gian Carlo Venturini from 1 April until 1 October 2021.

Life
Born in Piove di Sacco from Sammarinese father and Italian mother, and grew up in Padua, Italy, Nicolini graduated the Barbarigo Episcopal Institute of Padua and after that, the Faculty of Foreign Languages and Literatures at the University of Urbino.

He worked in the tourism sector while residing in the different countries and in 1999, at the age of twenty-eight, he returned to San Marino, and worked in a two financial companies and in a banking institution. Nicolini joined the RETE Movement and in 2016 he was elected a member of the Grand and General Council, where he held the position of a President of the San Marino Delegation at the Council of Europe, in Strasbourg.

Nicolini has published a book of boxing literature, along the lines of his Facebook page Nicolini Tells About Boxers, which has achieved some editorial success. Recently, by AIEP Edition, he published an anthology of short stories entitled Sottacqua.

He is married to Rebecca and is the father of two children.

Since 23 January 2023 he has been Vice-President of the Parliamentary Assembly of the Council of Europe.

Publications

Honours

Foreign honours 
  : Knight Grand Cross with Collar of the Order of Merit of the Italian Republic (16 June 2021)

References

1970 births
Living people
People from the Province of Padua
Sammarinese people of Italian descent
University of Urbino alumni
Sammarinese writers
Captains Regent of San Marino
Members of the Grand and General Council
RETE Movement politicians